In mathematics, two sets or classes A and B are equinumerous if there exists a one-to-one correspondence (or bijection) between them, that is, if there exists a function from A to B such that for every element y of B, there is exactly one element x of A with f(x) = y. Equinumerous sets are said to have the same cardinality (number of elements). The study of cardinality is often called equinumerosity (equalness-of-number). The terms equipollence (equalness-of-strength) and equipotence (equalness-of-power) are sometimes used instead.

Equinumerosity has the characteristic properties of an equivalence relation. The statement that two sets A and B are equinumerous is usually denoted

The definition of equinumerosity using bijections can be applied to both finite and infinite sets, and allows one to state whether two sets have the same size even if they are infinite. Georg Cantor, the inventor of set theory, showed in 1874 that there is more than one kind of infinity, specifically that the collection of all natural numbers and the collection of all real numbers, while both infinite, are not equinumerous (see Cantor's first uncountability proof). In his controversial 1878 paper, Cantor explicitly defined the notion of "power" of sets and used it to prove that the set of all natural numbers and the set of all rational numbers are equinumerous (an example where a proper subset of an infinite set is equinumerous to the original set), and that the Cartesian product of even a countably infinite number of copies of the real numbers is equinumerous to a single copy of the real numbers.

Cantor's theorem from 1891 implies that no set is equinumerous to its own power set (the set of all its subsets). This allows the definition of greater and greater infinite sets starting from a single infinite set.

If the axiom of choice holds, then the cardinal number of a set may be regarded as the least ordinal number of that cardinality (see initial ordinal). Otherwise, it may be regarded (by Scott's trick) as the set of sets of minimal rank having that cardinality.

The statement that any two sets are either equinumerous or one has a smaller cardinality than the other is equivalent to the axiom of choice.

Cardinality 
Equinumerous sets have a one-to-one correspondence between them, and are said to have the same cardinality. The cardinality of a set X is a measure of the "number of elements of the set". Equinumerosity has the characteristic properties of an equivalence relation (reflexivity, symmetry, and transitivity):
Reflexivity Given a set A, the identity function on A is a bijection from A to itself, showing that every set A is equinumerous to itself: .
Symmetry For every bijection between two sets A and B there exists an inverse function which is a bijection between B and A, implying that if a set A is equinumerous to a set B then B is also equinumerous to A:  implies .

An attempt to define the cardinality of a set as the equivalence class of all sets equinumerous to it is problematic in Zermelo–Fraenkel set theory, the standard form of axiomatic set theory, because the equivalence class of any non-empty set would be too large to be a set: it would be a proper class. Within the framework of Zermelo–Fraenkel set theory, relations are by definition restricted to sets (a binary relation on a set A is a subset of the Cartesian product ), and there is no set of all sets in Zermelo–Fraenkel set theory. In Zermelo–Fraenkel set theory, instead of defining the cardinality of a set as the equivalence class of all sets equinumerous to it one tries to assign a representative set to each equivalence class (cardinal assignment). In some other systems of axiomatic set theory, for example in Von Neumann–Bernays–Gödel set theory and Morse–Kelley set theory, relations are extended to classes.

A set A is said to have cardinality smaller than or equal to the cardinality of a set B, if there exists a one-to-one function (an injection) from A into B. This is denoted |A| ≤ |B|. If A and B are not equinumerous, then the cardinality of A is said to be strictly smaller than the cardinality of B. This is denoted |A| < |B|. If the axiom of choice holds, then the law of trichotomy holds for cardinal numbers, so that any two sets are either equinumerous, or one has a strictly smaller cardinality than the other. The law of trichotomy for cardinal numbers also implies the axiom of choice.

This theorem does not rely on the axiom of choice.

Cantor's theorem 
Cantor's theorem implies that no set is equinumerous to its power set (the set of all its subsets). This holds even for infinite sets. Specifically, the power set of a countably infinite set is an uncountable set.

Assuming the existence of an infinite set N consisting of all natural numbers and assuming the existence of the power set of any given set allows the definition of a sequence N, P(N), P(P(N)),  of infinite sets where each set is the power set of the set preceding it. By Cantor's theorem, the cardinality of each set in this sequence strictly exceeds the cardinality of the set preceding it, leading to greater and greater infinite sets.

Cantor's work was harshly criticized by some of his contemporaries, for example by Leopold Kronecker, who strongly adhered to a finitist philosophy of mathematics and rejected the idea that numbers can form an actual, completed totality (an actual infinity). However, Cantor's ideas were defended by others, for example by Richard Dedekind, and ultimately were largely accepted, strongly supported by David Hilbert. See Controversy over Cantor's theory for more.

Within the framework of Zermelo–Fraenkel set theory, the axiom of power set guarantees the existence of the power set of any given set. Furthermore, the axiom of infinity guarantees the existence of at least one infinite set, namely a set containing the natural numbers. There are alternative set theories, e.g. "general set theory" (GST), Kripke–Platek set theory, and pocket set theory (PST), that deliberately omit the axiom of power set and the axiom of infinity and do not allow the definition of the infinite hierarchy of infinites proposed by Cantor.

Dedekind-infinite sets 
In some occasions, it is possible for a set S and its proper subset to be equinumerous. For example, the set of even natural numbers is equinumerous to the set of all natural numbers. A set that is equinumerous to a proper subsets of itself is called Dedekind-infinite.

The axiom of countable choice (ACω), a weak variant of the axiom of choice (AC), is needed to show that a set that is not Dedekind-infinite is actually finite. The axioms of Zermelo–Fraenkel set theory without the axiom of choice (ZF) are not strong enough to prove that every infinite set is Dedekind-infinite, but the axioms of Zermelo–Fraenkel set theory with the axiom of countable choice are strong enough. Other definitions of finiteness and infiniteness of sets than that given by Dedekind do not require the axiom of choice for this, see .

Compatibility with set operations 
Equinumerosity is compatible with the basic set operations in a way that allows the definition of cardinal arithmetic.

Furthermore, equinumerosity is compatible with cartesian products:
 If  and  then 
 A × B ~ B × A
 (A × B) × C ~ A × (B × C)
These properties are used to justify cardinal multiplication.

Given two sets X and Y, the set of all functions from Y to X is denoted by XY. Then the following statements hold:
 If A ~ B and C ~ D then 
 AB ∪ C ~ AB × AC for disjoint B and C.
 (A × B)C ~ AC × BC
 (AB)C ~ AB×C
These properties are used to justify cardinal exponentiation.

Furthermore, the power set of a given set A (the set of all subsets of A) is equinumerous to the set 2A, the set of all functions from the set A to a set containing exactly two elements.

Categorial definition 
In category theory, the category of sets, denoted Set, is the category consisting of the collection of all sets as objects and the collection of all functions between sets as morphisms, with the composition of functions as the composition of the morphisms. In Set, an isomorphism between two sets is precisely a bijection, and two sets are equinumerous precisely if they are isomorphic as objects in Set.

See also 
 Combinatorial class
 Hume's principle

References 

Basic concepts in infinite set theory
Cardinal numbers

de:Mächtigkeit (Mathematik)#Gleichmächtigkeit, Mächtigkeit